The 2012 CIS Women's Ice Hockey Championship was held March 8 to March 11, 2012, in Edmonton, Alberta, to determine a national champion for the 2011–12 women's ice hockey season. The tournament was played at Clare Drake Arena and was hosted by the University of Alberta for the first time in school history.

The third-seeded Calgary Dinos won the first gold medal in program history by defeating the sixth-seeded Montréal Carabins by a score of 5–1 in the gold medal game.

Seedings
Six CIS teams qualified for the tournament and were divided into two pools to play a round-robin tournament to determine the two teams who would play in the championship game. The winner of Pool A played the winner of Pool B in the gold medal game.

Pool A

Pool B

Game summaries

CIS Medal round

5th-place game

Bronze-medal game

Gold-medal game

Final results

Awards and honours

All-Tournament Team

Goaltender: Amanda Tapp, Calgary Dinos
Defence: Stephanie Ramsay, Calgary Dinos
Defence: Élizabeth Mantha , Montréal Carabins
Forward: Kim Deschênes, Montréal Carabins
Forward: Leslie Oles, McGill Matlets
Forward: Hayley Wickenheiser, Calgary Dinos

Other

Tournament MVP: Amanda Tapp, Calgary Dinos
R.W. Pugh Fair-Play Award: Andrea Boras, Alberta Pandas

Player of the game awards
5th-place game: Sarah Hilworth, Alberta; Laura Bradley, PEI
Bronze medal game: Michelle Daigneault, McGill; Laura Brooker, Wilfrid Laurier
Gold medal game: Elizabeth Mantha, Montreal; Hayley Wickenheiser, Calgary

References

External links 
 Championship Website
 2012 Championships Broadcast on Web

CIS Women's Ice Hockey Championship
U Sports women's ice hockey
Ice hockey in Alberta
University of Alberta